Abān ibn al-Walīd ibn ʿUqba ibn Abī Muʿayṭ was a member of the Umayyad family who served as governor of Hims, Qinnasrin (with the Jazira) and Armenia for the caliphs Marwan I (r. 684–685) and Abd al-Malik (r. 685–705). His brother Uthman may have been his deputy in Armenia, or a governor in his own right, while another deputy of his was Dinar ibn Dinar, who defeated the Byzantines in 694/5.

In circa 688/89, Abd al-Malik tasked Aban with suppressing the rebellion of the Qaysi chieftain Zufar ibn al-Harith al-Kilabi, who, from his fortified, strategic outpost of al-Qarqisiya on the Euphrates, posed a nagging obstacle to the caliph's planned conquest of Iraq. That province was controlled by Mus'ab ibn al-Zubayr on behalf of his Mecca-based brother, Abd Allah, a rival caliph to Abd al-Malik. Zufar recognized the suzerainty of Ibn al-Zubayr and had previously staved off the Umayyad commander, Ubayd Allah ibn Ziyad, in 685/86. Aban defeated Zufar in battle, during which one of the latter's sons was slain, but was unable to dislodge him from al-Qarqisiya.

See also
Uqba ibn Abi Mu'ayt, his grandfather
Al-Walid ibn Uqba, his father
Al-Walid ibn Hisham al-Mu'ayti, his nephew

References

Sources 
 

7th-century Arabs
Umayyad dynasty
Umayyad governors of Arminiya
Umayyad governors of Hims
Umayyad governors of Qinnasrin